Pond Eddy is a hamlet in Sullivan County, New York, United States. The community is located along the Delaware River and New York State Route 97. The Pond Eddy Bridge links the hamlet to the community of Pond Eddy, Pennsylvania, which is only accessible via the bridge. Pond Eddy has a post office with ZIP code 12770.

References

Hamlets in Sullivan County, New York
Hamlets in New York (state)